The Sparta Warriors are a Norwegian ice hockey club based in Sarpsborg. They are members of the highest Norwegian ice hockey league, Eliteserien (known as GET-ligaen for sponsorship reasons). The Warriors are the ice hockey department of IL Sparta, a sports club founded in 1928. Ice hockey was first included as an activity in 1959, and is now one of two sports practised by the club, the other being football. The club competed as IL Sparta until 1986, at which point a near-bankruptcy highlighted the need to separate the various departments into financially independent units. They were then known as Sparta Hockey until 1995, when the club actually did go bankrupt and were reformed as IHK Sparta Sarpsborg. The turn of the millennium saw the introduction of the "Bears" nickname, which was used until the current "Warriors" came into use ahead of the 2004–05 season. As of 2010, the Warriors have completed thirty-five seasons in the Eliteserien, winning over 570 regular season games and three league titles.

Sparta entered the league system in 1963, starting out in the 3. divisjon (third tier). Promotion to the 1. divisjon (Eliteserien from 1990 onwards) was first won in 1967, but the club were unable to firmly establish themselves in the top division until the 1980–81 season. The 1980s would become Sparta's most successful period, with two Norwegian Championship titles won in 1984 and 1989. Following the bankruptcy in 1995, the Warriors had to start over in the lower tiers, but quickly made their way back to the top. Since 2002, they have made the playoffs every year, and were runners-up for the Norwegian Championship in 2009 after losing 2–4 to Vålerenga.

Seasons

Notes
Code explanation; GP—Games Played, W—Wins, L—Losses, T—Tied games, OTW—Overtime/Shootout wins, OTL—Overtime/Shootout losses, GF—Goals For, GA—Goals Against, Pts—Points
Sparta tied second with Høvik and Holmen after five games. Holmen were disqualified from taking part in the replays. Sparta lost the replay series against Høvik 3–3, 3–6.
Sparta remained in the 1. divisjon despite finishing third in qualifying. Winners Grüner did not participate in the 1. divisjon the following season and their spot passed to Sparta.
Sparta tied second with Forward after six games, lost the replay 3–5 and were thus relegated to the 2. divisjon.
Mellomspillet was a one-time continuation league contested in 1984–85 between the six highest ranked teams in the 1. divisjon. Of these six teams, the top four qualified for the Semi-finals of the Norwegian Championship.
Before the 1990–91 season, the 1. divisjon was renamed Eliteserien. Correspondingly, the 2. divisjon (second tier) was renamed 1. divisjon, the 3. divisjon (third tier) was renamed 2. divisjon etc.
Between the 1990–91 season and the 1993–94 season, the Eliteserien was divided into two parts. After the first 18 games, the top eight teams qualified for the second half of the Eliteserien. The bottom two teams were relegated to the 1. divisjon and would compete for the right to play in the Eliteserien in the following season. In 1990–91, the results of both rounds were added up to produce one league champion; in the three following seasons, there were two champions per season.
Sparta and three others clubs were deducted one point during the 1998–99 season.
Beginning with the 2002–03 season, all games in the Eliteserien have a winner. In addition, teams now receive three points for a win in regulation time, two points for a win in overtime and one point for a loss in overtime.
Totals as of the completion of the 2009–10 season.

References

Sparta Warriors seasons, List of
Seasons